G. Prout and Sons of Canvey Island, Essex, in the United Kingdom, was initially a builder of folding dinghies, canoes and kayaks founded in 1935. In the 1950s, the company moved to the construction of small sailing catamarans with Shearwater I and later Shearwater III, which the National Maritime Museum describes as the first production catamaran in the world.  The company then developed from small catamarans to larger cruising vessels. G. Prout & Sons was dissolved in 2002.

History
Geoffrey Prout, a boating expert, writer, and World War I veteran, founded the company in 1935 after receiving a patent for his folding boat (collapsible canoe) in January 1935. Brothers Francis and Roland Prout were canoeists who took part in the 1952 Helsinki Olympics. They worked in the family firm G. Prout & Sons Ltd, with their father, making folding canoes and dingies. They developed their first catamaran, the Shearwater I in the early 1950s. Initially they experimentally lashed together two K1 kayaks and added a bamboo platform and a mast and sail, and after the success of this went on to build the Shearwater I, in which they participated in local regattas. They then developed the Shearwater III.

The brothers were both awarded the  Freedom of the City of London and were appointed liverymen of the Worshipful Company of Shipwrights.

In 1975 the brothers became directors of a new company, Prout Catamarans, while Frank's son and Roland's daughter continued to make catamarans as G. Prout & Sons Ltd. Prout Catamarans changed its name to 199 AB Limited in 2001 and went into administration the same year.  In 1989 G. Prout & Sons Ltd was renamed Prout Holdings Ltd, and on 22 April 2020 the decision was made to wind up the company and a liquidator was appointed.

Cruising catamarans
Prouts built a large range of catamarans. The table is sorted initially by length of vessel, and is composed of those built in the company's heyday.

Folding Dinghies
Prout were also renowned for their folding dinghies made from wood and PVC Coated Canvas.  These were available as full Sailing Dinghies (able to be rowed or powered), rowing and powered only or rowing only.

The names of these dinghies were determined by their length.  

The 10 ft Seabird was a 10 ft Dagger board Sailing Dinghy, for sail, row and outboard, taking a sail area of 40sq. ft. and Folds to 10 ft. 3in.: 1 ft 6in: 6in and was sold complete with sail and all gear.  Oars were extra.  It weighed 102 lbs.
The 8 ft 6in Seaswallow was an 8 ft 6in. Dagger board Sailing Dinghy, for sail, row and outboard, taking a sail area of 40sq. ft. and was sold complete with sail and all gear.  Oars were extra.  It weighed 86 lbs.  
The 7 ft 6in Seasprite was an 7 ft 6in. Dagger board Sailing Dinghy, for sail, row and outboard, and was sold complete with sail and all gear.  Oars were extra.

Oars were 5 ft for the Seasprite and Seaswallow and 6 ft for the Seabird.
There was a spray deck available for the Seabird.  
There were trollies for the Seasprite and Seaswallow or Seabird.

Also, there were Rowing and outboard options which were identical to the sailing versions but without a Dagger board for the Seabird (10 ft)  and Seaswallow (8 ft 6in) versions.

Rowing only options were available as small yacht dinghies.
Yacht Dinghy at 7 ft 6in.
Scoprel at 6 ft.
Rowing Coracle at 5 ft.

There was an outboard attachment for the rowing dinghies.

References

British boat builders
Defunct manufacturing companies of England
British companies disestablished in 2002
British companies established in 1935
Companies based in Essex
Catamarans
Companies that have entered administration in the United Kingdom